Miss Earth Ecuador 2017, was the 1st edition of Miss Earth Ecuador held on August 27, 2017. At the end of the night Lessie Giler from Manabí was crowned by Miss Earth 2016, Katherine Espín.

Results

Placements

Special awards

Contestants

Debuts

 Azuay
  El Oro
  Esmeraldas
 Guayas
  Manabí
 Santo Domingo

Crossovers

 Lessie Giler was crowned Miss Teen Ecuador Universo 2015.
 Marissa Curipoma won the title of Reina de Atahualpa 2014. She competed at Reina de El Oro 2015, but she was unplaced.
 Wendy Cotera competed in Reina de San Lorenzo 2015, but she was unplaced.
 Mazly Yuqui competed in Reina de Bucay 2013. Also, Reina de Guayas 2014, but she was unplaced.
 Karina Nazareno competed in Reina de Guayas 2012, but she was unplaced.
 Daniela Garía was Reina de Bahía 2015.

References

Beauty pageants in Ecuador
Ecuador
2017 in Ecuador
2017 beauty pageants